Until Branches Bend is a Canadian drama film, directed by Sophie Jarvis and released in 2022. The film stars Grace Glowicki as Robin, a cannery worker who finds what she believes to be an invasive insect inside of a locally-grown peach, and must convince the community to take the threat seriously.

The cast also includes Alexandra Roberts, Quelemia Sparrow, Lochlyn Munro, Antoine DesRochers, Cole Sparrow-Crawford, Paul Kular, Janet Walmsley, Dave Kenneth MacKinnon, Michelle Brezinski, Charlie Hannah, Justin Lacey, Bhavkhandan Singh Rakhra, Michael Charrois, Leanne Merrett, Fabian Gujral, John Collins and Glenda Klassen.

The film entered production in summer 2021 in and around Penticton, British Columbia, under the working title Invasions.

The film premiered in the Discovery program at the 2022 Toronto International Film Festival on September 10, 2022.

Critical response
On Rotten Tomatoes, the film holds an approval rating of 88% based on 8 reviews, with an average rating of 5.30/10. Courtney Small of That Shelf wrote that "Until Branches Bend is such an effective and unnerving film because Jarvis keeps everything grounded in a reality that is identifiable. One is always aware of the dangers Robin faces while navigating a community that is becoming increasingly more hostile towards her. While Robin’s safety remains top of mind, thanks to Glowicki’s sensationally layered performance, one can also understand the frustration that the locals have because of big corporations monopolizing and governing how farmers and crop pickers make a living. Jarvis’ film also captures the arrogance of capitalism from a generational wealth perspective as well."

Awards
The film was longlisted for the Directors Guild of Canada's 2022 Jean-Marc Vallée DGC Discovery Award.

It won the award for Best British Columbia Film at the 2022 Vancouver International Film Festival.

References

External links

2022 films
2022 drama films
Canadian drama films
Films shot in British Columbia
Films set in British Columbia
2022 directorial debut films
2020s Canadian films